Hamdan Odha Al-Bishi (born 5 May 1981 in Bisha) is a Saudi Arabian sprinter.

Achievements

Personal bests
200 metres – 20.81 s (2004)
400 metres – 44.66 s (2000)

References

1981 births
Living people
Saudi Arabian male sprinters
Athletes (track and field) at the 2000 Summer Olympics
Athletes (track and field) at the 2004 Summer Olympics
Olympic athletes of Saudi Arabia
Asian Games medalists in athletics (track and field)
Athletes (track and field) at the 2002 Asian Games
Athletes (track and field) at the 2006 Asian Games
People from 'Asir Province
Asian Games gold medalists for Saudi Arabia
Asian Games silver medalists for Saudi Arabia
Medalists at the 2002 Asian Games
Medalists at the 2006 Asian Games
Islamic Solidarity Games competitors for Saudi Arabia
Islamic Solidarity Games medalists in athletics
21st-century Saudi Arabian people